The Long Loop on the Pecos is a 1927 American silent Western film directed by Leo D. Maloney and starring Maloney, Eugenia Gilbert, Frederick Dana.

Cast
 Leo D. Maloney as Jim Rutledge 
 Eugenia Gilbert as Rose Arnold 
 Frederick Dana as Arnold 
 Al Hart as Vining 
 Tom London as Laird 
 Bud Osborne
 Chet Ryan
 Merrill McCormick
 Bob Burns
 Dick La Reno
 Murdock MacQuarrie

References

External links
 

1927 films
1927 Western (genre) films
American black-and-white films
Pathé Exchange films
Films directed by Leo D. Maloney
Silent American Western (genre) films
1920s English-language films
1920s American films